Cost Accounting Standards (popularly known as CAS) are a set of 19 standards and rules promulgated by the United States Government for use in determining costs on negotiated procurements. CAS differs from the Federal Acquisition Regulation (FAR) in that FAR applies to substantially all contractors, whereas CAS applied primarily to the larger ones.

History
In 1970, Congress established the original Cost Accounting Standards Board (CASB) to promulgate cost accounting standards designed to achieve uniformity and consistency in the cost accounting principles followed by defense contractors and subcontractors in excess of $100,000, and to establish regulations to require defense contractors and subcontractors, as a condition of contracting, to disclose in writing their cost accounting practices, to follow the disclosed practices consistently and to comply with promulgated cost accounting standards.

After adopting 19 standards, the original CASB was dissolved on September 30, 1980; the standards, however, remained active and the CASB was revived in 1988 within the Office of Federal Procurement Policy (OFPP). The current CASB consists of five members: the OFPP Administrator (who serves as Chairman) and one member from the United States Department of Defense (this position is held by the Director of the Defense Contract Audit Agency), the General Services Administration, industry, and the private sector.

The Standards
The original CASB adopted 19 standards, numbered 401 through 420 (419 was never assigned). The new CASB readopted the original 19 standards with only minor modifications, and has yet to adopt any new standards.

CAS Applicability
CAS applies to contracts, not contractors, through Federal Acquisition Regulation clauses. A company may have contracts that are  subject to "full" CAS coverage (be required to follow all 19 standards), "modified" CAS coverage (required to follow only Standards 401, 402, 405, and 406), simultaneously have contracts that are subject to either modified or full coverage, or be exempt from coverage. However, a company under "full" coverage is not subject to a standard where it does not apply (e.g., a company which does not use standard costing does not have to comply with CAS 407).

"Modified" coverage applies to contracts when a company receives a single CAS-covered award of US$7.5 million or more; this is known as the "Trigger" contract; modified coverage applies to all contracts that are not exempt from CAS until the company meets the criteria for "Full" coverage.

"Full" coverage applies  when a company receives either one CAS-covered contract of US$50 million or more in the current accounting period, or, in the preceding cost accounting period, multiple CAS-covered contracts cumulatively totaling US$50 million. In addition to complying with all 19 standards (where applicable), the company must also file a CAS Disclosure Statement, which spells out the company's accounting practices (such as if certain costs are treated as direct contract charges or as part of overhead expense). There are two versions of the CAS Disclosure Statement: DS-1 applies to commercial companies while DS-2 applies to educational institutions.

In some instances, a contract may be exempt from CAS standards:
 Contracts awarded to small businesses are exempt from CAS, regardless of contract size.
 Any contract less than US$750,000 is always exempt.
 Any contract less than US$7.5 million is exempt, provided the company has not been awarded a contract greater than US$7.5 million in the past. 
 Contracts for commercial items
 Contracts awarded under sealed bid procedures, or where "adequate price competition" was available (the latter meaning where at least two companies had the ability to bid and perform on a contract, even if only one bid was later received)
 Contracts where the price is set by law or regulation
 Contracts awarded to foreign governments
 Contracts awarded to foreign concerns (only the disclosure statement and CAS 401 and 402 apply in this case) (See CFR 9903.201-1(b))

Previously, contracts where performance would have been performed entirely outside the United States (including territories and possessions) were also exempt, but this exemption was removed for new contracts effective October 11, 2011.

Furthermore, in some instances even where a company is subject to a standard, different rules may apply within the standard itself as to what a company is required to do. As an example, under CAS 403, if Company A's "residual expenses" (defined as those expenses incurred by the home office – usually the corporate office – which cannot be identified to a specific contract, group of contracts, or company segment) exceed a specified percentage of revenue, Company A must follow a dictated "three-factor" formula to allocate such expenses, but if Company B's residual expenses do not exceed the percentage (even if, in dollar terms, they are greater), Company B may follow the formula but is not required to do so.

Related links
 History of CAS and rules
 ICWAI.org
 Common Cost Reporting
 CASBICWAI

References

Government audit
Government procurement